Colin Campbell (1942–2001) was a Canadian video artist.

Life
Colin Campbell was born in Reston, Manitoba, 1942. Based in Toronto since 1973, Campbell  produced over 45 tapes. He received his BFA from the University of Manitoba (gold medal) and his MFA from Claremont Graduate School, California. Campbell's first academic position was at Mount Allison University, Sackville, New Brunswick, the subject of his video Sackville, I'm Yours. Campbell moved to Toronto in 1973, where he taught at the Ontario College of Art and later (from 1980) in the Department of Fine Art at the University of Toronto. Campbell was active in the artist-run centre movement and was a founding member of Vtape. He was active as a curator and a producer of artists' books.

Campbell saw himself as bisexual and bigendered.

Colin Campbell died of cancer on October 31, 2001, in Toronto.

Work
Campbell's work has been exhibited internationally since the mid-1970s, including the 1977 São Paulo Biennale, 1980 Venice Biennale and 1992 Istanbul Biennale. In 1990 the Winnipeg Art Gallery organized a national touring retrospective of his videotapes (1972–90). His first film, Skin, premiered at the Festival of Festivals (Toronto International Film Festival) in 1991. In 2008, Oakville Galleries held a retrospective exhibition of Campbell's work.

Awards
Campbell was awarded the Bell Canada Award in Video Art in 1996.

Select videography

 Sackville, I'm Yours (1972)
 Janus (1973)
 The Woman From Malibu (1976)
 Modern Love (1978)
 Bad Girls (1980)
 White Money (1983)
 The Woman Who Went too Far (1984)
 Bennies from Heaven (1986)
 No Voice Over (1986)
 Black and Light (1987)
 Fiddle Faddle (1988)
 Rendez-vous (1991)
 Invention (1993)

References

External links
 V tape

https://www.colincampbellvideoartist.com/biography.php

1942 births
2001 deaths
Bisexual artists
Canadian video artists
Canadian LGBT artists
Artists from Manitoba
University of Manitoba alumni
Bisexual men
Transgender men
Claremont Graduate University alumni
Non-binary artists
20th-century Canadian LGBT people
Bisexual non-binary people
Deaths from cancer in Ontario